Auriflama is a municipality in the state of São Paulo, Brazil. The population is 15,253 (2020 est.) in an area of 434.3 km². Auriflama belongs to the Mesoregion of São José do Rio Preto.

Economy

The Tertiary sector corresponds to 67.83% of Auriflama's GDP. The Primary sector is 9.68% of the GDP and the Industry corresponds to 22.49%.

References

Municipalities in São Paulo (state)